Olearia cordata is an aromatic slender shrub  with mostly mauve to dark blue daisy-like flowers endemic to New South Wales. Flowers appear in clusters at the end of branches, leaves are narrow and heart-shaped near the base.

Description
The branchlets and leaves are thickly covered in hairs and glands that are sticky and rough. The leaves are narrowly egg-shaped becoming heart shaped near the base and tapering to either a sharp point or rounded. The leaf margin is entire with a rolled edge. The flower centre is yellow. The fruit is smooth with several long hairs. Flowers from November to February.

Taxonomy and naming
Olearia cordata was first formally described by Nicholas Sèan Lander in 1975 and published in the journal Telopea. The specific epithet (cordata) is derived from the Latin word cordatus meaning "heart-shaped".

Distribution and habitat
This species is endemic to New South Wales in sparsely scattered locations  from Wisemans Ferry to Wollombi mostly in National Parks.  Grows in open scrubland on sandstone ridges  in dry sclerophyll forest.

Conservation status
Olearia cordata is listed as "vulnerable" in New South Wales by the Office of Environment and Heritage and under the Australian Government EPBC Act.

References

cordata
Asterales of Australia
Flora of New South Wales
Plants described in 1975